Manheim is a small neighborhood located near the Cheat River that is incorporated within the town of Rowlesburg in Preston County, West Virginia, United States.

The community was named, directly or indirectly, after Manheim, in Germany.

References

Geography of Preston County, West Virginia
Neighborhoods in West Virginia
Morgantown metropolitan area